Handball was contested at the 2015 Summer Universiade from 6 to 13 July in Gwangju, South Korea.

Medal summary

Medal table

Medal events

Men

Thirteen teams participated in the men's tournament.

Teams

Pool A

Pool B

Women

Twelve teams participated in the women's tournament.

Teams

Pool A

Pool B

References

External links
Official website

2015 Summer Universiade events
Handball at the Summer Universiade
2015 in handball